Eastbourne Carriage Sidings are located in Eastbourne, East Sussex, England, on the East Coastway Line near Eastbourne station.

Present 
They provide stabling for Southern Class 377 and 442 EMUs. There is also a carriage cleaning road and an engineers' siding.

References 

 Railway sidings in England
Rail transport in East Sussex